Tees Cottage Pumping Station is a Victorian pumping station complex at Broken Scar on the A67 near Low Coniscliffe just west of Darlington. The site dates from 1849, and was built to provide drinking water for Darlington and the surrounding area. It is a scheduled monument housing two completely original pumping engines in fully working order: a 1904 beam engine, built by Teasdale Brothers of Darlington, which is still steamed using its original 1902 Lancashire boilers; and a rare 1914 two-cylinder gas internal-combustion engine, the largest such engine surviving in Europe. Both engines can be seen in operation on certain weekends through the year, using their original pumps to pump water from the River Tees.

Beam engine 

The 1904 engine was one of the last waterworks beam engines ever built, and as such may be seen as representing the pinnacle of beam engine pumping development. It is a rotative, two-cylinder Woolf compound engine, designed by Glenfield and Kennedy of Kilmarnock and built by Teasdale Bros, under T&C Hawksley, Civil Engineers, London. It is housed in a building erected for an earlier beam engine in 1849. The engine ran almost continuously from 1904 to 1926, when new electric pumps were commissioned; thereafter it remained on operational standby until the mid-1950s, and continued to be run one day each year, on the order of the Borough Engineer, until at least 1968.

Gas engine 
The 1914 engine is by Richard Hornsby & Sons of Grantham, with pumps by Hawthorn, Davey & Co. of Leeds, all housed in a building of 1853 which previously accommodated an earlier steam engine. It presently runs on mains gas, but originally used producer gas from an adjacent plant on site. The producer plant is still in situ and open to the public; however it suffered at least two explosions over the years, evidence of which is still clearly visible, and it is no longer operational.

Ancillary buildings and structures 
The steam and gas engines were superseded by a set of electrically powered centrifugal pumps installed in 1926 and which ran until 1980. These too remain in situ and are on public view. A machine tool workshop has survived, complete with the belt-driven line shafting, as has the on-site blacksmith's forge, which is often fired up and demonstrated on open days. Three of the four original filter ponds are also extant. The original Superintendent's house now houses a tea-room for visitors.

The site and its significance 
Tees Cottage Pumping Station was closed in 1980, and placed in the care of a Preservation Trust. (The site is still owned by Northumbrian Water, which continues to supply Darlington from its Broken Scar works, just across the A67 road from Tees Cottage). Tees Cottage is one of 2 sites in Britain (the other being Kew Bridge) which shows all 3 forms of water pumping (steam, internal combustion, electric). The significance of the site is summarised thus by H C Devonshire:
"Tees Cottage really is unique. An analysis of 115 other sites in England, Scotland and Wales ... shows that while 50% of them have one or more engines in steam, very few are on their original site and using their original boilers, and only one on the listing, a gasworks exhauster engine in Scotland, can still do its original duty. Given that Tees Cottage also has what is believed to be the largest working preserved gas engine in Europe and still has all the electric pumps and switch gear from 1926, and still pumps water as intended, this station is a very rare opportunity for future generations to study not only the total history of water pumping and engines but also the totality of life in the Victorian and Edwardian era in a complete and original context".

See also 
 Ryhope Engines Museum for another working example of preserved waterworks beam engines in County Durham.

References

External links 

 Tees Cottage Pumping Station website
 Video of the beam engine, gas engine, and workshop line shafting in operation (with captions)

Preserved beam engines
Water supply pumping stations
Buildings and structures in the Borough of Darlington